The Nooney Ricket 4 (also known as The Nooney Rickett IV) is an American rock and roll group.

They appeared on such television programs as Shindig! and in such films as Winter A-Go-Go and Pajama Party.

References

External links

American musical groups